Čibutkovica is a village situated in Lazarevac municipality in Serbia.

References

External links

Populated places in Serbia
Lazarevac